The Marsham Towers were three towers at the corner of Marsham Street and Great Peter Street in Westminster, London. They served as the headquarters of the Department of the Environment.

Redevelopment
The redevelopment of the site was long planned. The site was originally a gas works and had first included two gas holders (built 1875), renovated in World War 2 for use as bomb shelter 'citadels' - the North Rotunda and the South Rotunda. A new 'steel-framed building' was also added in 1940–41. Both rotundas were designed to survive the impact of a 500 lb bomb and had  concrete roofs. In 1943 the lowest level of the North Rotunda (codenamed Anson) was kitted out as the reserve to the Cabinet War Rooms. The previous reserve Paddock in Dollis Hill was seen to be unsatisfactory and too far from Whitehall.

By the early 1960s the increasing numbers of civil servants led to the commissioning of Eric Bedford  (1909–2001), chief architect for the Ministry of Public Buildings and Works, to design a headquarters building for three separate ministries, the Ministry of Housing and Local Government, the Ministry of Transport and the Ministry of Public Building and Works. His design, published in 1963, placed three twenty-storey slab blocks parallel north to south on top of a three-storey podium slab raised on stilts. Each tower had exposed concrete framing, being built in a new 'box-shell' system which mixed pre-cast concrete and on-site construction. They were 66 metres tall. The towers incorporated the rotundas in the base and were completed in 1971.

The Rotundas were used as a communications centre and a civil service sports club, amongst other things. By the time the towers were complete, the three separate ministries had merged into the Department of the Environment, and having separate towers proved inefficient. The bland frontage of the blocks, described in Nikolaus Pevsner's architectural guides as "the very image of faceless bureaucracy", was much criticised and local people nicknamed them as "the three ugly sisters".

Michael Heseltine announced on 6 February 1992 that he proposed to knock the building down. In 1996 an architectural competition was held for a mixed-use replacement but did not produce a clear outcome. Eventually it was decided to build a replacement for the Home Office on the site and the towers were taken down in 2002–03. The site is now occupied by Sir Terry Farrell's new building at 2 Marsham Street, which the Home Office first occupied in February 2005 and a housing development containing just over 100 apartments called New Palace Place.

References

External links
Subterranea Britannica on the Rotundas

Government buildings completed in 1971
National government buildings in London
Former buildings and structures in the City of Westminster
Buildings and structures demolished in 2003
1971 establishments in England
2003 disestablishments in England
Former skyscrapers
Demolished buildings and structures in London